Kyunsu, better known as Kanmaw, is a small town in the Mergui Archipelago of south-eastern Burma. It is the principal town of Kyunsu Township in Myeik District  which since 1990 has covered much of the archipelago. The town lies on the north-eastern coast of Kanmaw Kyun, south-west of Myeik (Mergui).

References

Populated places in Tanintharyi Region
Township capitals of Myanmar